The Red Dot Design Award is a German international design prize.

Red Dot may also refer to:
 A descriptive name for Bindi, a forehead decoration applied in the center of the forehead close to the eyebrows
 A mark on a tire sidewall, indicating the point of maximum radial force and runout
 Little red dot, or red dot, a reference to the nation of Singapore
 On the Red Dot, a Channel NewsAsia current affairs programme about Singapore
 Red dot sight, type of reflector gun sight
 RedDot Solutions, the Web Solutions Group of Open Text business unit of Open Text Corporation
 "The Red Dot", 1991 Seinfeld TV episode
 The untitled eighth track on Pearl Jam's 1998 album Yield 
 Red Dot (film), a 2021 film